Mark Titley is a former international Wales rugby union player. A winger, he played his club rugby for London Welsh RFC, Bridgend RFC and Swansea RFC. Titley was in the Wales squad for the 1987 Rugby World Cup.

References

Living people
Rugby union players from Swansea
Welsh rugby union players
Wales international rugby union players
Swansea RFC players
Rugby union wings
1959 births